Yvonne Walker Keshick (born October 19, 1946 as Binaakwiikwe, or Falling Leaves Woman) is an Anishinaabe quillwork artist and basket maker.

Life 
Keshick was born in 1946 in Charlevoix, Michigan, as an enrolled citizen of the Little Traverse Bay Bands of Odawa Indians. She descended from many generations of Odawa/Ojibwa quillworkers. Her great-aunt Anna Odei’min is one of the best-known WPA Arts and Crafts Project artists.

Keshick became an apprentice of Susan Shagonaby (daughter of Mary Ann Kiogima) in 1969. Shagonaby taught Keshick "from scratch", using cleaned quills fresh off a rotting porcupine. Shagonaby later became the director of the Chief Andrew J. Blackbird House. Keshick began quilling full-time in the 1980s.

She resides in Petoskey, Michigan.

Work 
Keshick is a basket-maker and quillworker.  She uses porcupine quills, sometimes supplemented by other natural materials such as birch bark and sweetgrass in the decorative articles she creates. It can take a year for her to acquire the quills she needs for a particular work of art. Her designs incorporate traditional elements from her culture as well as animal and plant designs passed down through the generations. She does not dye the quills, relying on subtle differences in their color to provide shadowing effects.
She is known for innovating a method of laying the quills to create dynamic textures that give life to her compositions and the animals and birds that she features.

Keshick taught her children, who continue to make quill art. On teaching her art, Keshick has said,

Her work is featured in the collection of the Michigan State University Museum.

Awards and recognition 
Keshick received a 1992 Michigan Heritage Award, and was a 2014 National Endowment for the Arts National Heritage Fellow.

In 2006, she was a featured participant in the Smithsonian Folklife Festival's Carriers of Culture Native Weaving Traditions program, and in 2015, she spoke at the Great Lakes Folk Festival.

Exhibits 
 Hearts of Our People: Native Women Artists, (2019), Minneapolis Institute of Art, Minneapolis, Minnesota, United States.
 Anishnaabek Art: Gift of the Great Lakes, (2016), Harbor Springs History Museum, Harbor Springs, Michigan

References

Further reading 
 
 
 

1946 births
Living people
National Heritage Fellowship winners
Native American basket weavers
Native American women artists
Odawa people
Ojibwe people
Artists from Michigan
People from Charlevoix, Michigan
People from Petoskey, Michigan
21st-century American women
20th-century Native American women
20th-century Native Americans
21st-century Native American women
21st-century Native Americans
Native American people from Michigan